Frank Johnson (born 1 November 1936) is a former Australian rules footballer who played with Footscray and Fitzroy in the Victorian Football League (VFL). Before moving to Victoria he played for several seasons with South Fremantle in the West Australian Football League (WAFL).

Notes

External links 
		

WAFL statistics

Living people
1936 births
Australian rules footballers from Western Australia
Western Bulldogs players
Fitzroy Football Club players
South Fremantle Football Club players